Priče o vremenu i životu – Live at SKC (trans. Tales of Time and Life – Live at SKC) is the first live album by and Serbian heavy metal band Alogia, released in 2006. The album was recorded on May 13, 2005 in Studentski kulturni centar in Belgrade.

The album features numerous guest musicians from the top bands of the former Yugoslav hard rock and heavy metal scene: Osvajači guitarist Dragan Urošević, Riblja Čorba guitarist Vidoja Božinović and drummer Vicko Milatović, Kerber vocalist Goran Šepa, and Divlje Jagode guitarist Sead Lipovača. The album also features Dunja Deurić and Damjan Deurić from the Serbian gothic/power metal band Demether on backing vocals.

Track listing
"Metamorfoza I" - 5:43
"Metamorfoza II" - 3:12
"Novi dan" - 4:39
"Zar sunce već zalazi" - 4:28
"Kao snegovi" - 3:35
"Magija" - 4:30
"Maska"  - 4:07
"Vreme istine" - 4:39
"Samson" - 3:38
"Gde si u ovom glupom hotelu"  - 5:47
"Lament" - 5:48
"Amon" - 3:51
"Hajde da se volimo"  - 4:26
"Mezimac"  - 4:01
"Egregor" - 3:14
"Bajka" - 3:43
"Motori"  - 4:36
"Sećanje na slike iz sna" - 3:46

DVD version

The DVD version was released in 2007. It featured three additional tracks: "Tonem u san", "What a Feeling" and "Priča o životu". It also featured bonus consisting of interviews, clips from Alogia performances at the EXIT festival and Belgrade Beer Fest, and official music videos for "What a Feeling" and "Novi dan".

Tracks
"Metamorfoza I"
"Metamorfoza II"
"Novi dan"
"Zar sunce već zalazi"
"Kao snegovi"
"Maska"
"Tonem u san"
"Magija"
"Gde si u ovom glupom hotelu"
"Lament"
"Vreme istine"
"What a Feeling" 
"Bajka"
"Hajde da se volimo"
"Mezimac"
"Samson"
"Egregor" - 3:14
"Motori"
"Amon"
"Priča o životu"
"Sećanje na slike iz sna"

Personnel
Nikola Mijić - vocals
Srđan Branković - guitar
Miroslav Branković - guitar
Ivan Vasić - bass guitar
Branislav Dabić - keyboards
Vladimir Đedović - keyboards
Damir Adžić - Drums

Guest musicians
Dragan Urošević - guitar (on "Maska")
Vidoja Božinović - guitar (on "Gde si u ovom glupom hotelu")
Vicko Milatović - drums (on "Gde si u ovom glupom hotelu")
Goran Šepa - vocals (on "Hajde da se volimo" and "Mezimac")
Sead Lipovača - guitar (on "Motori")
Dunja Deurić - backing vocals
Damjan Deurić - backing vocals

References

External links
Priče o vremenu i životu – Live at SKC at  Discogs
Priče o vremenu i životu – Live at SKC at Encyclopaedia Metallum

Alogia (band) albums
2006 live albums
2006 video albums
Live video albums
One Records (Serbia) live albums
One Records (Serbia) video albums